George Abraham (جورج إبراهيم) is a Palestinian American poet. He is the author of Birthright and the specimen's apology.

Education 
He received his M.S. in Bioengineering at Harvard University, and now attends the Litowitz Creative Writing program at Northwestern University in Evanston.

Poetry 
In 2018, Abraham won the Cosmonauts Avenue Poetry Prize, judged by Tommy Pico. He was named "Best Poet" at the 2017 College Union Poetry Slam International. He hopes to continue bringing awareness to Palestinian human rights and socio-economic struggles through art.

Abraham is a board member for RAWI (Radius of Arab American Writers) and a Kundiman fellow.

the specimen's apology 
His illustrated chapbook the specimen's apology was published in January 2019 by Sibling Rivalry Press, and illustrated by Leila Abdelrazaq. In a review on The Rumpus, torrin a. greathouse said of the specimen's apology: "The works contained within the specimen’s apology are a lush and sprawling series of overlapping parallel universes in which Abraham is constantly innovating and abandoning forms. Each formal experiment is a temporary hole into a new world that opens, then collapses, behind the reader. This creates within the chapbook a shifting, fractious landscape where its author’s interdisciplinary work as a PhD in bioengineering shines through...While, in the hands of a different poet, this could all prove extremely daunting to the reader, Abraham wields these high concepts with incredible grace and trust in their audience." The Michigan Quarterly Review said, "In some ways, to be Palestinian is to inhabit this bracketed body deemed imaginary and to queer it through language, imagination, and memory. In The Specimen’s Apology, George Abraham does not attempt to erase the erasures but rather to inhabit the intimacy of worlds that are, in their mistranslation, profoundly familiar."

Birthright 
His full-length collection Birthright was published in April 2020 from Button Poetry. Sa’ed Atshan, author of Queer Palestine and the Empire of Critique, said: "Birthright captures how politics penetrates our psyche and consciousness, but as the poems triumph through anguish, we are able to hold onto life. The journey of reading these words is also a universal one, bringing together conceptions of faith, love, family, settler-colonialism, violence, queerness, and the search for home." In 2021, Birthright was a finalist for the Lambda Literary Award for Bisexual Literature and won the Arab American Book Award for Poetry.

Science 
Abraham was a Bioengineering PhD candidate at Harvard University in the Harvard John A. Paulson School of Engineering and Applied Sciences. He's said, "Both poetry and science, at their essence, try to give a language to that which we don’t understand. They do it in different ways, but that core process of looking at something, observing the world or observing a phenomenon, and assigning meaning to it is the process I am interested in." Abraham's project at Harvard looked to provide insights into how predictions can affect the brain’s process for learning motor tasks.

References 

American people of Palestinian descent
Poets from Massachusetts
Non-binary poets
21st-century American poets
Harvard School of Engineering and Applied Sciences alumni
Living people
Year of birth missing (living people)
American LGBT poets
American non-binary writers